Howard Williams may refer to:

Howard Williams (humanitarian) (1837–1931), English humanitarianism and vegetarianism activist
Howard Williams (archaeologist), British archaeologist
Howard Williams (TV presenter), British TV presenter with Basil Brush glove puppet
Howard Williams (conductor) (1947), British opera, orchestral and choral conductor
Howard Williams (ceramist) (1935), New Zealand ceramist and art writer
Howard Andrew "Andy" Williams (1927–2012), American singer and television host
Howard Earl "Howie" Williams (1927–2004), American basketball player
Howard Lloyd Williams (born 1950), British political scientist and philosopher